is a former Japanese football player.

Club statistics

References

External links

1980 births
Living people
Hannan University alumni
Association football people from Ibaraki Prefecture
Japanese footballers
J2 League players
Japan Football League players
Thespakusatsu Gunma players
Association football defenders